Tilting may refer to:

 Tilt (camera), a cinematographic technique
 Tilting at windmills, an English idiom
 Tilting theory, an algebra theory
 Exponential tilting, a probability distribution shifting technique
 Tilting three-wheeler, a vehicle which leans when cornering while keeping all of its three wheels on the ground
 Tilting train, a train with a mechanism enabling increased speed on regular railroad tracks
 Tilting, Newfoundland and Labrador, a town on Fogo Island, Canada
 Tilting, a type of jousting